Luigi (Aloysius) Barlassina (30 April 1872, Turin, Italy – 27 September 1947) was a Latin Patriarch of Jerusalem.

Biography

Barlassina received his ordination on 22 December 1894 and later became Ph.D. in theology and canon law. In 1911 he worked at the Spiritual College of the Congregation for the Evangelization of Peoples in Rome and from 1912 to 1918 at Vicario Curato at the Lateran Basilica. Pope Benedict XV in 1918 appointed him Titular bishop of Capharnaum and appointed him Auxiliary bishop in Jerusalem. He received his episcopal consecration by Cardinal Basilio Pompili on 8 September 1918 in Rome. In 1919 Barlassina became Apostolic Administrator of Jerusalem and he was in 1920 by Pope Pius XI appointed Patriarch of Jerusalem, the only Latin patriarch in the East.

From 1928 until his death in 1947 he was also rector and permanent administrator of the Order of the Holy Sepulchre in Jerusalem (though not grand master).

References

External links
 http://www.catholic-hierarchy.org/bishop/bbarlass.html 

20th-century Italian Roman Catholic priests
1872 births
1947 deaths
Latin Patriarchs of Jerusalem
Grand Crosses of the Order of the White Lion
20th-century Roman Catholic archbishops in Israel